Kate Klunk is a member of the Pennsylvania House of Representatives, representing the 169th House district in York County, Pennsylvania. Klunk was elected to serve as a representative on November 4, 2014.

Klunk was one of 75 members of Pennsylvania's Congressional Delegation to sign a letter on December 4, 2020, regarding an Election Review for the 2020 presidential election. They asked that the state's election results be overturned.

In 2022, Klunk co-sponsored the “Save Women's Sports Act” which is a proposal to prevent transgender girls from competing in girls' school sports.

References

External links

Official Web Site
PA House profile

Living people
People from York County, Pennsylvania
Republican Party members of the Pennsylvania House of Representatives
Place of birth missing (living people)
Pennsylvania lawyers
21st-century American politicians
1982 births